Darrell L. Fullington (born April 17, 1964) is a former American football free safety.

Fullington was drafted fifth round out of the University of Miami to the Minnesota Vikings in 1988. Darrell was also with the New England Patriots, waived by them in September 1991 and eventually claimed by the Tampa Bay Buccaneers. He started for most of the 1992 season, having been primarily a nickel back and special teamer under Bucs coach Richard Williamson.

External links
http://football.about.com/od/nfldrafthistory/a/1988draftresult_2.htm
http://www.regencyhomes.com/MDA/MDA_2005.cfm
http://ww1.sportsline.com/b/member/history/greatmoments/terps.htm

1964 births
Living people
People from New Smyrna Beach, Florida
Sportspeople from Volusia County, Florida
Players of American football from Florida
American football safeties
Miami Hurricanes football players
New England Patriots players
Tampa Bay Buccaneers players
Minnesota Vikings players